Al Riyadi Aramex Basketball Club is a Jordanian professional basketball club that competes in the Jordanian Premier Basketball League and are based in Amman, Jordan. In the team's inaugural season in 2001–02, they competed in the Jordanian Division II league, winning the championship and the Jordanian Cup, and earned a promotion to the Division I league for the 2002–03 season. Before 2001, Aramex sponsored Al-Jazeera Basketball Club for 13 years. Aramex split amicably with Al-Jazeera and established Al-Riyadi in 2001 in an effort to promote basketball as well as an array of competitive sports.

Records

Division I league
Jordanian Division I league champion: 2017, 2016 & 1997 (under Jazeera Aramex)

Division II league
Jordanian Division II league champion: 2002

Jordanian Cup
Jordanian Cup winner: 2002, 2012, 2013

Jordanian Super Cup
Winner: 2003

WABA Champions Cup
 1998: Runners-up (under Jazeera Aramex)
 2003: 4th 
 2006: Quarter-finalist
 2007: 8th 
 2011: 8th

Dubai International Tournament
2013: 4th

ASU Tournament
2009: 3rd

After ASU & Al Mutahed (Leb) and ahead of Al Jaish (Syr) and Orthodox.

References

External links
Team profile at Asia-basket.com
Team profile at Goalzz.com

Basketball teams in Jordan
Sport in Amman